Dragana Todorović may refer to:

Bebi Dol
Jana (singer)